Rugrats in Paris: The Movie (Also known as The Rugrats Movie 2) is a 2000 animated comedy film based on the Nickelodeon animated television series Rugrats and the second film in the series. This film marks the first appearance of Kimi Watanabe and her mother, Kira. The film also marks the appearance of the first significant villains in the Rugrats franchise, the child-hating Coco LaBouche and her accomplice, Jean-Claude. The events of the film take place before the series' seventh season.

The film was released in the United States on November 17, 2000, almost two years after the release of The Rugrats Movie in 1998. Rugrats in Paris: The Movie was more well-received than its predecessor and grossed over $103 million worldwide against a production budget of $30 million. This was the final Rugrats film to feature Christine Cavanaugh, who retired from being a full-time voice actor in 2001 and died in 2014.

Plot
 

At the wedding reception of Lou Pickles and his new wife Lulu, a mother-child dance saddens Chuckie Finster with memories of his mother, who died shortly after he was born. Realizing that he and his son miss that presence in their lives, Chas Finster starts thinking of re-marrying. Tommy Pickles' father Stu is then summoned to EuroReptarland, a Japanese amusement park in Paris, to fix a malfunctioning Reptar robot he designed for the park's stage show.

The entire Pickles, Finster and DeVille families travel to EuroReptarland, run by the ill tempered and child-hating Coco LaBouche, who is hoping to succeed her boss, Mr. Yamaguchi, as president of the Reptar corporation. When Yamaguchi tells her his successor must love children, she lies and tells him she is engaged to a man with a child. Angelica Pickles overhears their conversation and, when discovered eavesdropping, saves herself by telling Coco about Chas.

Coco begins pursuing Chas with the help of her put-upon but kindhearted assistant, Kira Watanabe, who tells the babies how Reptar was a feared monster before his gentler side was revealed by a princess. Hearing this, Chuckie decides he wants the park's animatronic princess to be his mother and goes in search of her along with the babies and Kira's daughter Kimi. Meanwhile, the Pickles' dog Spike gets lost in the streets of Paris in pursuit of a stray poodle named Fifi. 

While Coco wins over Chas, Chuckie remains deeply distrustful of her. At the Reptar show's premiere, Angelica informs Coco of Chuckie's wish to have the princess for his mother, prompting Coco to infiltrate the show disguised as the princess. She lures Chuckie on stage, where he is horrified to see her true identity; however, seeing his son go to Coco convinces Chas that he should marry her straight away. On the day of the wedding, Coco orders her accomplice, Jean-Claude, to keep the babies and Angelica from intervening. Kira learns of Coco's plot and threatens to tell Chas, but is thrown out enroute to the ceremony and hurries there by bicycle. 

Jean-Claude locks the children in the warehouse where the show's robots are kept. When Chuckie despairs of having a new mother who dosen't like him, a guilt-ridden Angelica reveals Coco's plan and her part in it and apologizes to Chuckie. Knowing the truth, Chuckie rallies the others to stop the wedding and they hurry to Notre Dame in the Reptar robot, picking up Kimi along the way. Jean-Claude pursues them piloting Reptar's nemesis, Robosnail, but is defeated by Reptar and knocked into the Seine River. 

Arriving at the church, Chuckie interrupts the wedding by screaming his first word, "No". Jean-Claude follows, unintentionally revealing Coco's true nature, and Chas calls off the wedding in disgust. Mr. Yamaguchi, who is in attendance, dismisses Coco after Angelica informs him about Coco’s plan. Angelica then rips Coco's dress when she knocks down the babies; humiliated, Coco flees the chapel, and Spike chases Jean-Claude away. As Chas apologizes to Chuckie for everything Coco put them both through, Kira arrives and apologizes to him for not speaking up sooner. Realizing they have much in common, Chas and Kira develop feelings for each other. Returning home, they marry and the Finsters and Watanabes (who also adopt Fifi) become a new family.

Voice cast

Main
 Christine Cavanaugh as Chuckie Finster
 E. G. Daily as Tommy Pickles
 Cheryl Chase as Angelica Pickles
 Kath Soucie as Phil DeVille, Lil DeVille and Betty DeVille
 Tara Charendoff as Dil Pickles
 Dionne Quan as Kimi Watanabe
 Jack Riley as Stu Pickles
 Melanie Chartoff as Didi Pickles
 Michael Bell as Chas Finster and Drew Pickles
 Julia Kato as Kira Watanabe
 Tress MacNeille as Charlotte Pickles
 Phil Proctor as Howard DeVille

Supporting
 Susan Sarandon as Coco LaBouche
 John Lithgow as Jean-Claude

Guest
 Joe Alaskey as Lou Pickles
 Debbie Reynolds as Lulu Pickles
 Cree Summer as Susie Carmichael
 Mako Iwamatsu as Mr. Yamaguchi
 Marlene Mituko, Darrel Kunitomi and Goh Misawa as the Villagers of the "Princess Spectacular" Show
 Tim Curry, Kevin Michael Richardson and Billy West as the Sumo Singers
 Paul DeMeyer as the Street Cleaner and Dog Catcher
 Phillip Simon as the Animatronic Bus Driver
 Richard Michel as the French Worker
 Charlie Adler as the Inspector
 Phillipe Benichou as the Ninja
 Dan Castellaneta as the Priest
 Lisa McClowry as the Princess
 Casey Kasem as the Wedding DJ
 Roger Rose as the Wedding DJ for the Finsters
 Margaret Smith as the Stewardess

Soundtrack

A soundtrack album for the film, titled Rugrats in Paris: The Movie: Music from the Motion Picture, was released on November 7, 2000 on Maverick Records and features new music from Jessica Simpson, Baha Men, Tionne "T-Boz" Watkins of TLC, Amanda and Aaron Carter. Like the last soundtrack, it also contains an enhanced part: the theme song to the film "Jazzy Rugrat Love" by Teena Marie.

Release
The film was released on November 17, 2000, by Paramount Pictures and Nickelodeon Movies.

Home media
Paramount Home Entertainment released the film on VHS and DVD on March 27, 2001. In 2009, Paramount released the film via iTunes and the PlayStation Store.

On August 29, 2017, Rugrats in Paris was re-released on DVD.

On March 8, 2022, along with The Rugrats Movie and Rugrats Go Wild, the film was released on Blu-ray as part of the trilogy movie collection.

Reception

Critical reception
The site's critical consensus read: "When the Rugrats go to Paris, the result is Nickelodeon-style fun. The plot is effectively character-driven, and features catchy songs and great celebrity voice-acting." Metacritic gave a film a weighted average score of 62 out of 100 based, on 25 critics, indicating "generally favorable reviews". Audiences polled by CinemaScore gave the film an average grade of "A−" on an A+ to F scale.

Roger Ebert gave the film three out of four stars, stating, "The point is, adults can attend this movie with a fair degree of pleasure. That's not always the case with movies for kids, as no parent needs to be reminded. There may even be some moms who insist that the kids need to see this movie. You know who you are." Common Sense Media gave the film a three out of five stars, stating, "Eighty minutes of visual surprises, clever comedy." Empire gave the film a three out of five stars, stating, "Just as good as the last outing, this is great kiddie fare with some filmic references for the adults."

Plugged In wrote, "If parents are wanting more of what they see on the Rugrats TV show (plenty of potty humor, disrespectful language and zero discipline), then this movie lives up to expectations. Never is a child scolded for making a mess or reprimanded for being rude (of course, some of this is due to the fact that many of the characters aren’t old enough to talk and only communicate with each other). The movie is cleverly written—it actually has the ability to hold adults’ attention for longer than three minutes—but it's not funny that chaos is the norm and children get to do whatever they want whenever they want. Neither is it appropriate for a children's film to tip its hat to such R-rated flicks as The Godfather and A Few Good Men."

Box office
The film grossed $76.5 million in North America and $26.8 million in other territories for a worldwide total of $103.3 million, against a $30 million budget.

In the United States, it opened at #2 behind How the Grinch Stole Christmas, grossing $22.7 million in its opening weekend for an average of $7,743 from 2,934 venues. In the United Kingdom, it opened at #3, behind Bridget Jones's Diary and Spy Kids.

Crossover/Sequel
A third and final installment, entitled Rugrats Go Wild, was released on June 13, 2003, featuring the characters from The Wild Thornberrys.

References

External links

 
 
 
 
 

2000 films
2000 animated films
2000 directorial debut films
2000s American animated films
2000s English-language films
2000s children's animated films
American children's animated adventure films
American children's animated comedy films
American sequel films
Rugrats (franchise)
Animated films set in Paris
Animated films based on animated series
Films scored by Mark Mothersbaugh
Films with screenplays by David N. Weiss
Films about babies
Films about missing people
Films about vacationing
Films about weddings
Films set in amusement parks
Parody films based on The Godfather
Rugrats (film series)
Klasky Csupo animated films
Nickelodeon animated films
Nickelodeon Movies films
Paramount Pictures animated films
Paramount Pictures films